Anna Maria College participates in 13 intercollegiate sports at the NCAA Division III level. Twelve of Anna Maria's teams are members of the Great Northeast Athletic Conference (GNAC), while football plays in the Eastern Collegiate Football Conference (ECFC). The AMCATS name is derived from the acronym Anna Maria College Athletic Team Sports.

Sports Sponsored

Varsity Sports

Football

AMCATS football is one of the most recent additions to the Anna Maria Athletics arsenal. Founded in 2009, the team won its first and second football games at the end of the 2011 season. They won their first ECFC football championship on November 13, 2021 after going 7–2 in regular season play (5–1 in ECFC play) therefore receiving their first NCAA Division III Football Championship appearance. In their final regular season game of the year the Amcats defeated the SUNY Maritime Privateers 31–7. to clinch the ECFC title. The Amacts will face the Delaware Valley Rams on November 20, 2021 in the NCAA Division III Football Championship first round.

References

External links